Grandyle Village is a hamlet and census-designated place (CDP) in the town of Grand Island in Erie County, New York, United States. As of the 2010 census, it had a population of 4,629.

Grandyle Village is part of the Buffalo–Niagara Falls Metropolitan Statistical Area.

Geography
Grandyle Village is located at  (42.99636, -78.95436), on the eastern shore of Grand Island along the Niagara River. Interstate 190 forms the northeastern edge of the CDP, which extends south along the Niagara River as far as Beaver Island State Park. The Beaver Island Parkway forms the main north-south road through the community.

Demographics

References

Hamlets in New York (state)
Census-designated places in Erie County, New York
Census-designated places in New York (state)
Buffalo–Niagara Falls metropolitan area
Hamlets in Erie County, New York